Kwame Gyawu-Kyem (born 21 September 1927) is a Ghanaian politician and a member of the first Parliament of the fourth Republic representing
the Atwima Mponua constituency in the Ashanti Region of Ghana. He represented the National Democratic Congress.

Early life and education
Gyawu-Kyem was born in Atwima Mponua in the Ashanti Region of Ghana. He attended the St. Augustine's College and Ghana National College for his secondary education. He continued to Regent Street Polytechnic to study Journalism and consequently obtained his Higher Diploma.

Politics
Gyawu-Kyem was first elected into parliament on the ticket of the National Democratic Congress for the Atwima Mponua Constituency in the Ashanti Region of Ghana during the 1992 Ghanaian parliamentary election. He was defeated by Akwasi D. Afriyie of the New Patriotic Party in the 1996 Ghanaian general election. He served for one term as a parliamentarian for Atwima Mponua Constituency.

Career
Gyawu-Kyem is a journalist by profession and a former member of parliament for the Atwima Mponua Constituency in the Ashanti Region of Ghana.

Personal life
He is a Christian.

References

Possibly living people
1927 births
Regent University alumni
National Democratic Congress (Ghana) politicians
Ghanaian journalists
People from Ashanti Region
Ghanaian MPs 1993–1997
Ghanaian Christians
Ghana National College alumni